Hoohoo is an unincorporated community located in Raleigh County, West Virginia, United States.

Hoohoo has been noted for its unusual place name.

References 

Unincorporated communities in West Virginia
Unincorporated communities in Raleigh County, West Virginia